Dalowali (Urdu: ﮈﺍ ﻟﻮﻭﺍ ﻟﯽ) is a suburban village located in Eastern Sialkot on Jammu Road, Punjab, Pakistan, resting at approximately 256 meters above sea level, 7 km from the Indian border village of Sujeet Ghar and neighbouring Sialkot Cantonment. The Indian border accompanying Sialkot is of the state of Jammu and Kashmir; Dalowali is only 30.3 km away from the main Jammu City (winter capital of Jammu and Kashmir). 
Famous Building Sultan Bahoo Marquee And Benquite Hall.
Jammu Road Dalowali

Climate

References

External links
 https://www.google.com.pk/search?ved=1t:65428&hl=en&_ga=2.4106359.670263332.1606301096-703580208.1606301096&q=Dalowali&ludocid=2235158241357406167&lsig=AB86z5XofKjYOQ0Yckjc49G103ku#fpstate=lie
 http://www.ecp.gov.pk/content/na/NA-110.pdf
 https://web.archive.org/web/20110726072515/http://www2.ecp.gov.pk/vsite/ElectionResult/Search.aspx?constituency=PA&constituencyid=PP-121
 https://web.archive.org/web/20120209042900/http://www.nrb.gov.pk/lg_election/union.asp?district=29&dn=Sialkot

Villages in Sialkot District